The folkloric dance of the Tobas speaks of the ancient past of Bolivia. It has roots in a time when the Incas were the predominant force in the Andean highlands region. Tobas is an athletic dance comprising agile steps accentuated with many jumps and bounds.

History
The Tobas were a tribe of warriors who lived in the Chaco region of Bolivia. The Incas admired the Tobas dance and they were taken from their Amazonian homeland by the Emperor Tupac Yupanqui. The dance and music of the Tobas have been reinterpreted by subsequent people of Bolivia.

Today, Tobas is a prominent part of the annual carnivals (like the Carnaval de Oruro or the Bolivian Festiva in Virginia).

Dance
The Tobas dance is a special representation of energy - a singular dance with impressive jumps performed by the dancers to impress the audience. This unique dance is performed during religious and other festivities as well as the Oruro Carnival. Not only do you need good physique, but a lot of stamina and energy.

The dance steps have special names: Bolivar (quick with regular jumps); camba (very agile, one meter high jumps); chucu-chucu (with a faster rhythm that amuse the audience, in the foot tips, almost in the knees); and the cullahui jump.

Costume
The typical Tobas costume is headwear entirely made of feathers, decorated with jewels, a skirt and top decorated made with colorful fabrics, with beads and fringes on the bottom, with cows feet sewed onto fabric to tie around the ankle, spear or hatchet, bracelet of feathers, and an anklet of feathers.

Notes and references
 https://web.archive.org/web/20101222001648/http://www.boliviacontact.com/en/sugerencia/carnaval/tobas.php
 https://web.archive.org/web/20110403002414/http://www.boliviatravelsite.com/oruro_carnival_dances.php

Bolivian culture
Bolivian dances
Native American dances